Brenda Walsh (born 31 December 1952) is a former Canadian sprinter and middle-distance runner.

At the 1971 Pan American Games she placed fifth in the 400 metres.

At the 1974 British Commonwealth Games she won bronze in the 4 × 400 m relay. In the 400 metres she was eliminated in the heat, and in the 800 metres she was a semi-finalist.

In 1971 she was English vice champion in the 400 metres and in 1973 US indoor champion in the 440 yards.

References 

Canadian female sprinters
Canadian female middle-distance runners
Living people
1952 births
Athletes (track and field) at the 1974 British Commonwealth Games
Athletes (track and field) at the 1971 Pan American Games
Commonwealth Games medallists in athletics
Commonwealth Games bronze medallists for Canada
Pan American Games track and field athletes for Canada
Medallists at the 1974 British Commonwealth Games